Cache High School is a secondary school located within Comanche County in Cache, Oklahoma.

Extra-curricular activities

State Championships

2013  Oklahoma 5A State Champions, girls’ slow pitch Softball 
2010  Oklahoma 4A State Champions, girls’ Basketball
2010  Oklahoma 4A State Champions, girls’ Volleyball
1991  Oklahoma 2A State Champions, Academic Team

Clubs and organizations
Cache High School sponsors the following clubs and organizations for the student body: Academic Club, Art, Cache High School Band, History Club, FFA (Future Farmers of America), 4-H Club, FCCLA (Family, Career and Community Leaders of America), Journalism, Music, National Honor Society, Spanish, Student Council, Tech-Connect.

References

Public high schools in Oklahoma
Schools in Comanche County, Oklahoma
1902 establishments in Oklahoma Territory